Oum-Hadjer Airport  is a public use airport located near Oum-Hadjer, Batha, Chad.

See also
List of airports in Chad

References

External links 
 Airport record for Oum-Hadjer Airport at Landings.com

Airports in Chad
Batha Region